Surly may refer to:

Fiction 
 Surly Squirrel, a cartoon character created by Peter Lepeniotis
 Surly Bob, a 19th-century English children's novel by Luisa C. Silke

Organizations 
 Surly Bikes, a Bloomington-based brand in the U.S. state of Minnesota
 Surly Brewing Company, a beer producer and distributor in the U.S. state of Minnesota
 Surly Bob's, a former sports bar in Yellowknife, Northwest Territories, Canada

See also 
 HMS Surly, four ships of the British Royal Navy